Joseph Tacopina (born 14 April, 1966) is an American lawyer, media personality and professional sports executive. He is a personal attorney for former U.S. president Donald Trump, representing him in New York regarding the criminal investigation of several payments made to Stormy Daniels.

Early life and education 
He was born and raised in Brooklyn, New York to Italian immigrants. Raised in Sheepshead Bay, Brooklyn, Tacopina attended Poly Prep and Skidmore College, before graduating, in 1991, from the University of Bridgeport law school, now Quinnipiac University School of Law.

Legal career
Tacopina is a name partner and lead trial attorney at his Manhattan based law firm, Tacopina, Seigel & DeOreo.

He began his career as a prosecutor in Brooklyn, where he won 39 of 40 trials he led. After moving to private practice, he became known as an advocate for high-profile clients in high-profile cases. Tacopina clients have included New York Yankees third baseman Alex Rodriguez, Joran van der Sloot, who was the suspect in the mysterious disappearance of Natalee Holloway, an American high schooler in Aruba, Melanie McGuire, Michael Jackson,
Italian sailor Chico Forti, actor Lillo Brancato, Fox News host Sean Hannity, New York state senator Hiram Monserrate, and Kimberly Guilfoyle. He has also represented NFL team Washington Commanders and team owner Daniel Snyder

He was instrumental in helping to vindicate client Meek Mill.  Mill's case sparked a national debate on criminal justice reform.  Jay-Z, another Tacopina client, voiced his thoughts on the unjust system that seemingly targets minorities by keeping them in legal limbo.

Tacopina was the lead trial attorney in 2019 representing Nauman Hussain, who was charged with criminally negligent homicide in the previous year's Schoharie limousine crash.

Representing Donald Trump (2023) 
Tacopina began representing former U.S. president Donald Trump in early 2023.

Media appearances 
Tacopina has appeared on several US television networks. He has been a commentator for Fox News, CNN, Newsmax, MSNBC and has served as "legal correspondent" for ABC to Perugia following the Amanda Knox case. Tacopina has also appeared regularly on WABC Radio's "Bernie & Sid Morning Show" in New York. He has also appeared as an attorney on the American reality television court show, You the Jury. Tacopina made headlines for his defense of new client Donald Trump on The Beat with Ari Melber on March 14, 2023, where he conceded to host Melber that Trump had lied in 2018 to reporters about the hush money but that it was legally correct by the then-president due to the nature of the NDA.

The Guardian, a legal TV drama that was inspired by Tacopina's courtroom style ran for four seasons on CBS from 2001 to 2004.

Honors and awards 
GQ Magazine described him as “the best-dressed, smoothest-talking, hardest-working criminal defense attorney going.”

In 2018, Rev. Al Sharpton's civil rights organization,  National Action Network, named Tacopina their humanitarian of the year. He was also named on Billboard's most influential people in hip hop list. That same year Tacopina was named man of the year by New York state's Commission for Social Justice.

In 2020, he was honored by New York's 13th congressional district as "one of the most decorated, effective, well-respected criminal defense lawyers in the United States today."

Soccer 
In 2011, Tacopina was part of the American consortium led by Thomas R. DiBenedetto, to become the owner of A.S. Roma and became vice-chairman of the board of directors, in October 2011. The position of vice-chairman was removed during 2012–13 season, but he remained as a member of the board, as well as a member of the internal control committee. On September 8, 2014 he resigned from the Roma board of directors.

A preliminary agreement to acquire Bologna F.C. 1909 was signed on September 17, 2014, which was formalized on October 8 by the board on Bologna FC. On October 15, Tacopina officially assumed the post of president of the Bologna football club. On November 17, 2014, Joey Saputo was appointed  chairman. Tacopina maintained his role as president until he resigned in October 2015.

He purchased Italian club Venezia F.C. in October 2015. He sold his shares and resigned in January 2020.

He became the first president in Italian soccer history to win three promotions in a row (Bologna 2014–15; Venezia 2015–16, 2016–2017).

Tacopina has held executive positions on four Italian soccer clubs. He is currently president and chairman of the board of S.P.A.L. He was president and board member of Venezia FC (2015–20), previously president and board member of Bologna FC (2014–15), and was the former vice president and board member of AS Roma (2011–14).

On August 13, 2021, he became president and owner of Italian soccer club S.P.A.L.

Personal life

He and his wife, Patricia have five children. He is a resident of Westport, Connecticut.

References

Living people
American people of Italian descent
American lawyers
American sports executives and administrators
Businesspeople from New York City
Venezia F.C.
Bologna F.C. 1909
1966 births
People from Sheepshead Bay, Brooklyn
People from Westport, Connecticut
Poly Prep alumni
Quinnipiac University alumni
Skidmore College alumni